The 1973 Air Force Falcons football team represented the United States Air Force Academy as an independent during the 1973 NCAA Division I football season. Led by 16th-year head coach Ben Martin, the Falcons compiled a record of 6–4 for the third consecutive season and were outscored by their opponents 239–223. Air Force played their home games at Falcon Stadium in Colorado Springs, Colorado.

Schedule

References

Air Force
Air Force Falcons football seasons
Air Force Falcons football